Lucia Starovičová (born November 13, 1982 in Nitra) is a Slovak former competitive figure skater. She is a five-time (2001−05) national bronze medallist and qualified to the free skate at the 2001 World Junior Championships, where she finished 17th.

Programs

Competitive highlights 
JGP: Junior Series/Junior Grand Prix

References

External links 
 

1982 births
Living people
Slovak female single skaters
Sportspeople from Nitra